The 1998 CIAU football season began on September 2, 1998, and concluded with the 34th Vanier Cup national championship on November 28, 1998, at the SkyDome in Toronto, Ontario, with the Saskatchewan Huskies winning the third Vanier Cup championship in program history. Twenty-four universities across Canada competed in CIAU football this season, the highest level of amateur play in Canadian football, under the auspices of the Canadian Interuniversity Athletics Union (CIAU). This year would be the last for the Carelton Ravens until their re-establishment in 2013 as the program was discontinued in 1998.

Regular season

Standings 
Note: GP = Games Played, W = Wins, L = Losses, T = Ties, PF = Points For, PA = Points Against, Pts = Points

Teams in bold earned playoff berths.

Post-season awards

Award-winners 
 Hec Crighton Trophy – Éric Lapointe, Mount Allison
 Presidents' Trophy – Warren Muzika, Saskatchewan
 Russ Jackson Award – Jean-Philippe Darche, McGill
 J. P. Metras Trophy – Garret Everson, Calgary
 Peter Gorman Trophy – Kojo Aidoo, McMaster
 Frank Tindall Trophy – Larry Haylor, Western

All-Canadian team

Post-season 
Notably this year, the Dunsmore Cup was played over two days due to an overtime game being called due to darkness. The November 14 game was played at Concordia Stadium which did not have artificial lights at the time. The Rouge et Or and the Stingers had played to a 10-10 tie after two overtime periods, which ended at 4:46pm local time when nightfall had set in. Referee Ron Morin discussed with Laval's Jacques Chapdelaine and Concordia's Pat Sheahan and agreed that the game would be played on the next day, November 15. That game was played with two 10-minute halves where the Stingers won with a Jason Casey 22-yard fumble-return touchdown which sealed the 17-12 victory.

Playoff bracket

Championships 
The Vanier Cup was played between the champions of the Atlantic Bowl and the Churchill Bowl, the national semi-final games. This year, the Ontario conference's Yates Cup championship team, Western Mustangs visited the Canada West Hardy Trophy champion Saskatchewan Huskies for the Churchill Bowl. The winners of the Atlantic conference Loney Bowl championship, the Acadia Axemen, were effectively the home team for the Atlantic Bowl in Halifax, Nova Scotia which featured the Dunsmore Cup Ontario-Quebec champion Concordia Stingers. The Huskies and the Stingers both won and advanced to the 34th Vanier Cup game which was played in the SkyDome in Toronto. The Concordia Stingers made their first appearance in a Vanier Cup game, which resulted in a loss to an experienced Saskatchewan Huskies team that won their second championship in three years.

Notes 

U Sports football seasons
CIS football season